Lake Wamala is a freshwater lake in Uganda. Its wetlands contain endangered species of birds and animals including the sitatunga ("enjobe" in Luganda). The lake is of traditional and cultural significance to the people of Buganda in Central Uganda.

Location
The lake is shared by the districts of Mubende, Mityana, and Gomba in the Buganda Region of Uganda. The coordinates of Lake Wamala are 0°20'44.0"N, 31°53'16.0"E (Latitude:0.345545; Longitude:31.887778).

Overview
It is dotted by many islands, including  Lwanju Island, Mabo Island, and Bagwe Island, Kiraza, Kazinga, among others. Several rivers  flow into the lake, including the River Nyanzi, the River Kitenga, the River Kaabasuma, the River Mpamujugu, and the River Bbimbye. The lake is drained by the Kibimba River into the Katonga River, which in turn drains into Lake Victoria. The Kibimba River, however, is highly seasonal and for much of the time its course remains essentially dry. Lake Wamala is of significant economic and cultural interest locally and is jointly administered by the districts of Mubende, Mityana, and Mpigi, each of which share a part of the lake along common borders.

History
More than 4,000 years ago Lake Wamala was part of Lake Victoria, but has since receded into its current state. One apocryphal myth supposes that Lake Wamala derives its name from a King Wamala, the last monarch of the Bachwezi dynasty and that King Wamala disappeared into the lake at a site near Lubajja fishing village called Nakyegalika and his spirit resides in the lake.

Flora and fauna
The vegetation surrounding Lake Wamala is dominated by papyrus, other floaters, and water-based vegetation. There are also trees such as Raphia and other palms. A variety of animal species such as sitatunga, wild pigs, hippopotamus, bushbuck, waterbuck, vervet monkey, baboon, guinea fowl, and turaco live near the lake. Existing fish species include tilapia, catfish, and lungfish.

Fishing patterns
During the 1960s and the early 1970s, Lake Wamala was an important source of both fresh and smoked fish sold locally and in the big towns in Buganda. Due to mismanagement and uncontrolled, unregulated commercial fishing on the lake, the fish were depleted in the mid-1970s. Climate change has also worsened the lake conditions, to the detriment of the local fishermen and their families.

See also
 Empire of Kitara
 Bunyoro-Kitara
 Kabaka of Buganda

References

External links
Rivers, lakes, wetlands: could water become the world's biggest market?

Wamala
Katonga River
Buganda
Gomba District
Mityana District
Mubende District